Xingxing Fox (stylized as XingXing Fox) is a cartoon that airs on China Central Television (CCTV). The main character is a pink fox and the main setting is a magical forest. It is produced by the Xiamen Bluebird Cartoon Company, headquartered in the Xiamen Software Park 2 in Siming District, Xiamen.

On February 27, 2012 "The Vocation Experiences of Xing Xing Fox" won the Chinese TV Star Award, an award sponsored by the State Administration of Radio, Film and Television (SARFT).

At the 2013 Bologna Children's Book Fair Xiamen Bluebird announced it was giving Trajectory Inc. the worldwide distribution rights to Xingxing Fox. Trajectory is scheduled to make 50 Xingxing Fox e-books.

Characters

 Xingxing Fox - A pink fox
 Dulu Bear - A yellow bear
 Duoduo Pig - A pink pig
 Kazhi Rabbit - A white rabbit
 Mofa Mama - A witch
 Tango Wolf - A dancing purple wolf

See also
 Pleasant Goat and the Big Big Wolf, another children's television series in China
 Boonie Bears, an animated 3D cartoon
 Shima Shima Tora no Shimajirō, a Japanese children's television series that airs in China as Qiao Hu

References

Further reading
 "“星星狐”将携系列产品参展第二届漫博会." (Archive." (Archive) 中国名牌杂志社 at Xinhua (来源： 东莞日报). September 16, 2010.
 "星星狐荣获“2012年第四届中国年度十大动画衍生产品制造奖”" Xinhua.
 "“星星狐”将携系列产品参展第二届漫博会" (Archive" (Archive) People.com.cn (人民网). September 8, 2010.
 "星星狐荣获“2012年第四届中国年度十大动画衍生产品制造奖”." People.com.cn (人民网). October 9, 2012.

External links
  Xingxing Fox - China Central Television
  Xingxing Fox - Sohu
  Xingxing Fox - Sina Weibo
  Xingxing Fox - China Toy & Juvenile Products Association (中国玩具和婴童用品协会)
  Xiamen Bluebird Cartoon Company
 "Xingxing Fox Makes the Jump from Chinese Children’s Television to eBooks Around the World" (company press release). Trajectory Inc. at PRWeb.

2007 Chinese television series debuts
2000s animated television series
2010s Chinese television series
2010s animated television series
Chinese children's animated fantasy television series
Mandarin-language television shows
Animated television series about foxes